Nagasaki 1st district is a constituency of the House of Representatives in the Diet of Japan. It is located in Southwestern Nagasaki and covers the city of Nagasaki without the former towns of Kinkai and Sotome. As of 2009, 353,871 eligible voters were registered in the district.

Before the electoral reform of 1994, Nagasaki city was part of the multi-member Nagasaki 1st district where five Representatives had been elected by single non-transferable vote.

The district has been leaning towards the Democratic Party and its predecessors since its creation. Only in a 1998 by-election, Liberal Democrat Masakazu Kuranari, the eldest son of Tadashi Kuranari, longtime former Representative for the multi-member 1st district, could win the seat, but lost it to Democrat Yoshiaki Takaki in the following general election of 2000.

List of representatives

Election results

References 

Districts of the House of Representatives (Japan)